Forrest Crissey (born June 1, 1864, Stockton, New York, Died November 5, 1943, Geneva, Illinois), was a prolific early twentieth-century American writer of books and articles. His most famous work was Tattlings of a Retired Politician, a 1904 book which entails the humorous but fictional letters of William Bradley.

Other notable works included The story of foods, 1917; Where Opportunity Knocks Twice, 1914; The Romance of Moving Money (Brink's, Inc.), 1934; Alexander Legge 1866-1933, 1936; stories and articles in The Saturday Evening Post. From 1901 to 1934 he was on their staff while also writing other books, articles, and biographical information of various types.

Personal 
Was married to Kate Darling Shurtleff (13 July 1887 - 1943) until his death. They had one child together. A forebear of the film producer JC Crissey.

References

External links 

 Forrest Crissey at the Harpers Magazine
 Forrest Crissey  at the Internet Archive

1864 births
1943 deaths
American male writers
People from Chautauqua County, New York